Leonid Talmaci (born 26 April 1954) is a Moldovan politician. He was born in Reteni and served as the head of the National Bank of Moldova (1991–2009).

He was a candidate in the Moldovan presidential election, 2011–2012.

References

External links 
 Între cine se va da lupta pentru fotoliului prezidenţial?
 VIP Magazin - Leonid Tălmaci

1954 births
Living people
Moldovan politicians
Governors of National Bank of Moldova